Michael Tye may refer to:

Michael Tye (artist), Australian mosaic artist
Michael Tye (philosopher), American philosopher